Luis Aloy Vidal (8 February 1930 – 8 June 2012) was a Spanish professional football player and manager.

Career
Born in Santa Coloma de Gramenet, Barcelona, Catalonia, Aloy played as a midfielder for FC Barcelona between 1950 and 1954. He later played for Real Oviedo, Cádiz, Sabadell and Figueres.

Aloy was later manager of Barcelona Atlètic and Real Valladolid.

Later life and death
Aloy died on 8 June 2012.

References

External links

Stats and bio at Cadistas1910 

1930 births
2012 deaths
People from Santa Coloma de Gramenet
Sportspeople from the Province of Barcelona
Spanish footballers
Footballers from Catalonia
Association football midfielders
La Liga players
Segunda División players
FC Barcelona players
Real Oviedo players
Cádiz CF players
CE Sabadell FC footballers
CF Badalona players
UE Figueres footballers
Spanish football managers
FC Andorra managers
UE Sant Andreu managers
FC Barcelona Atlètic managers
Real Valladolid managers
Zamora CF managers
CD Logroñés managers
Pontevedra CF managers
UE Lleida managers
CF Badalona managers
CD Condal players
UE Sants players